Can't Maintain (stylized as can't maintain.) is the third studio album by Andrew Jackson Jihad.

Production

Jeff Rosenstock played horns and theremin on the album. The release was mastered by Carl Saff. In 2019, AJJ frontman Sean Bonnette ranked Can't Maintain as his third favourite album from the band's six releases to date and described it as "the only record thus far where we knew the sequence going into it." In 2019, AJJ celebrated the album's 10th anniversary by playing it in full at a fundraising concert in Phoenix, Arizona.

Track listing

Reception
Adam Finley, writing for PopMatters, described Can't Maintain as one of the best albums of 2009. Robin Smith of PopMatters wrote that the album "opened with scuzzy electric guitars and pounding drums" and called the track "We Didn't Come Here to Rock" a "delightfully ironic rocker." The A.V. Club included the track “Who Are You?” in its list of songs about bad fathers, adding that Bonnette "[coats] his complex emotions in witty one-liners."

Personnel

Andrew Jackson Jihad
Sean Bonnette - lead vocals, guitar, kazoo, glockenspiel
Ben Gallaty - bass, guitar on "Evil", backing vocals
Preston Bryant - guitar on "You Don't Deserve Yourself", piano on "White Face, Black Eyes" 
Deacon Batchelor - drums
Owen Evans - banjo, piano on "Evil"

Additional personnel
Jeff Rosenstock - saxophone, theremin
Kepi Ghoulie - whistling
David Jerkovich - drums, viola, mandolin, electric guitar, organ, and trumpet all on "Love Will Fuck Us Apart"
Davy Charles - trumpet, trombone on "Truckers Are the Blood"
Matt Keegan - trombone
Tobie Milford - violin
Jaspen Nelson - trombone on "Truckers Are the Blood"
Allyson Seconds - vocals on "Love In The Time Of Human Papillomavirus"
Carl Saff - mastering
Jalipaz Nelson - recording, mixing, noise
Ryan Piscitelli - artwork, layout

References

2009 albums
AJJ (band) albums
Asian Man Records albums